"True Navigation" is the seventh single by J-pop duo Two-Mix, released by King Records on June 4, 1997. Composed by the duo of Shiina Nagano and Minami Takayama, the song was used as an image song in the Japanese dub of The X-Files season 3.

The single peaked at No. 7 on Oricon's weekly singles chart. It sold over 142,000 copies and was certified Gold by the RIAJ.

Track listing
All lyrics are written by Shiina Nagano. All music is composed by Minami Takayama. All music is arranged by Two-Mix.

Chart position

Certification

Other versions 
An English-language version of the song was recorded on the duo's 2000 self-cover album BPM Cube.

References

External links 
 
 

1997 singles
1997 songs
Two-Mix songs
Japanese-language songs
King Records (Japan) singles
Songs written by Minami Takayama